Michael or Mike Bennett may refer to:

Arts
 Mike Bennett (artist), American artist
 Michael Bennett (film director), New Zealand writer and director
 Michael Bennett (theater) (1943–1987), American musical theater director, writer, choreographer, and dancer
 Mike Bennett (writer) (born 1962), British script writer, playwright and record producer
 Michael Bennett (book series), a series of thriller books by best-selling author James Patterson

Politics
 Michael Bennet (born 1964), United States Senator from Colorado
 Michael John Bennett (1860–1944), Wisconsin State Assemblyman
 Michael S. Bennett (born 1945), Florida State Senator

Sports
 Michael Bennett (boxer) (born 1971), American professional boxer
 Michael Bennett (cricketer) (1909–1982), Somerset cricketer
 Michael Bennett (cyclist) (born 1949), British Olympic cyclist
 Michael Bennett (defensive lineman, born 1985), American football player
 Michael Bennett (defensive tackle, born 1993), American football player
 Michael Bennett (running back) (born 1978), American football player
 Michael Bennett (wide receiver) (born 1991), American football player
 Mickey Bennett (born 1969), English association footballer player
 Mike Bennett (rugby league) (born 1980), English professional rugby league player
 Mike Bennett (wrestler) (born 1985), American professional wrestler
 Mike Bennett (born 1967), of the professional golf instructing duo Mike Bennett and Andy Plummer
 M. S. Bennett (1881–1964), American college football player and coach

See also
 Gary Michael Bennett (born 1963), English footballer